USS Alpha (SP-586) was a motor yacht that served as a patrol boat in the United States Navy during World War I

History 
Alpha, a  motor yacht, was built in 1911 at Riverside, Rhode Island, by the Narragansett Bay Yacht Yard. She was purchased by the Navy on 19 May 1917 from Joel Fischer and commissioned that same day.
 
Assigned to the 2d Naval District section patrol, Alpha patrolled the waters of southern Massachusetts, Rhode Island, and Connecticut. The motorboat served the Navy through the end of World War I and into 1919.

On 23 December 1918, Alpha suffered a fire while at Melville, Rhode Island. The Navy tug  steamed from Newport to assist Alpha and her crew.

Her name was struck from the Navy list on 17 May 1919, and she was sold to Arthur Palmer of Quincy, Massachusetts, on 28 August 1919. Her ultimate fate is unknown.

Notes

References

External links 
 

Ships built in Rhode Island
World War I patrol vessels of the United States
1911 ships
Individual yachts